This is a list of the published works of Aliette de Bodard.

Novels

Obsidian and Blood series
 Servant of the Underworld, Angry Robot Books and JABberwocky Literary Agency, 2010
 Harbinger of the Storm, Angry Robot Books and JABberwocky Literary Agency, 2011
 Master of the House of Darts, Angry Robot Books and JABberwocky Literary Agency, 2011

Dominion of the Fallen series
 The House of Shattered Wings, Gollancz and Roc, August 18, 2015. Winner BSFA Award for Best Novel of 2015. Finalist for Locus Award for Best Fantasy Novel of 2016.
 The House of Binding Thorns, Gollancz and Ace Books, April 4, 2017
The House of Sundering Flames, Gollancz, July 25, 2019

Other
 In the Vanishers' Palace, JABberwocky Literary Agency, October 15, 2018

Novellas

Xuya Universe 
 On a Red Station, Drifting, Immersion Press, 2012. Finalist for Best Novella for the 2013 Hugo Awards, 2012 Nebula Awards, and 2013 Locus Awards.
 The Citadel of Weeping Pearls, Asimov's, October–November 2015, and JABberwocky Literary Agency. Finalist for Best Novella for the 2016 Locus Awards.
 The Tea Master and the Detective, Subterranean, 2018. Winner 2018 Nebula Award for Best Novella. Finalist for 2019 Hugo Award for Best Novella. Finalist for 2019 World Fantasy Award for Best Novella.
Seven of Infinities, Subterranean, October 2020. Finalist for Best Novella for the 2021 Locus Awards.

Other 

 Fireheart Tiger, Tordotcom, Feb 9, 2021. Nominated for 2022 Hugo Award for Best Novella.

Collections 
 Scattered Among Strange Worlds, Nine Dragons River, 2012. Includes short stories "Scattered Along the River of Heaven" and "Exodus Tides".

Short stories

Xuya Universe 
 "Rescue Party," in Mission Critical, ed. Jonathan Strahan, July 9, 2019.
"A Game of Three Generals," in Extrasolar: Tales of super Earths and hot Jupiters, ed. Nick Gevers, August 2017.
 "The Dragon That Flew Out of the Sun," in Cosmic Powers, ed. John Joseph Adams, Saga Press, April 2017.
"First Presentation," in Chasing Shadows, ed. David Brin and Stephen W. Potts, January 2017
 "Pearl," in The Starlit Wood, ed. Navah Wolfe and Dominik Parisien, Saga Press, October 2016. Finalist for 2017 Locus Award for Best Novelette.
"A Hundred and Seventy Storms," Uncanny Magazine, July/August 2016.
 "Crossing the Midday Gate," in To Shape the Dark, ed. Athena Andreadis, May 2016
 "A Salvaging of Ghosts", Beneath Ceaseless Skies, special Science Fantasy issue, March 2016.
 "A Slow Unfurling of Truth", in Carbide-tipped Pens, ed. Ben Bova and Eric Choi, Tor, December 2014
 "Three Cups of Grief, by Starlight", Clarkesworld Magazine, issue 100, January 2014. Winner BSFA Award for Best Short Story of 2015.
 "Memorials", Asimov's, January 2014. Reprinted in Apex Magazine, June 2016. Companion piece for "The Weight of a Blessing". Finalist for 2014 Locus Award for Best Short Story.
 "In Blue Lily's Wake," in Meeting Infinity, ed. Jonathan Strahan, Solaris, December 2015
 "A Slow Unfurling of Truth," in Carbide-Tipped Pens, ed. Ben Bova and Eric Choi, Tor Books, December 2014
 "The Days of War, as Red as Blood, as Dark as Bile," Subterranean, Spring 2014
 "The Breath of War," Beneath Ceaseless Skies, March 2014. Finalist for Best Short Story 2014 Nebula Award.
 "The Frost on Jade Buds," in Solaris Rising 3, August 2014.
 "The Weight of a Blessing," Clarkesworld Magazine, March 2013.
 "The Waiting Stars," The Other Half of the Sky, 2013. Reprinted in The Year's Best Science Fiction: Thirty-First Annual Collection by Gardner Dozois, 2014. Winner 2014 Nebula Award for Best Novelette. Finalist for Best Novelette in the 2015 Hugo Awards and 2015 Locus Awards.
 "Ship's Brother," Interzone, 2012. Reprinted in The Year's Best Science Fiction: Thirtieth Annual Collection by Gardner Dozois, 2013. Reprinted in Clarkesworld Magazine, January 2014.
 "Starsong" Asimov's 36/08 (Aug 2012)
 "Two Sisters in Exile," in Solaris Rising 1.5, July 2012. Reprinted in The Year's Best SF 18, ed. David G. Hartwell, Tor Books, December 2013.
 "Immersion," Clarkesworld Magazine, issue 69, June 2012. Winner 2012 Nebula Award for Best Short Story. Winner 2012 Locus Award for Best Short Story. Finalist for Best Short Story for the 2013 Hugo Awards, 2013 BSFA Awards, and 2013 Theodore Sturgeon Memorial Awards.
 "Scattered Along the River of Heaven," Clarkesworld Magazine, issue 64, January 2012. Reprinted in The Year's Best Science Fiction and Fantasy, 2013. Finalist for Best Short Story in the 2012 Theodore Sturgeon Memorial Awards.
 "Shipbirth", Asimov's, February 2011
 "The Shipmaker," Interzone, issue 231, September 2010. Winner BSFA Award for Best Short Story of 2010.
 "The Jaguar House, in Shadow", Asimov's, July 2010
 "Fleeing Tezcatlipoca", Space and Time magazine, issue 111, Spring 2010
 "Butterfly, Falling at Dawn, Interzone, issue 219, November 2008. Reprinted in The Year's Best Science Fiction: Twenty-Sixth Annual Collection, 2009.
 "The Lost Xuyan Bride," Interzone 213, November 2007
Science fiction book series

Obsidian and Blood series 
This section is arranged in the order the author suggests you read the stories:
 "Obsidian Shards", Writers of the Future XXIII, September 2007
 "Beneath the Mask," Beneath Ceaseless Skies, issue 8, January 2009.
 "Safe, Child, Safe," Talebones, issue 39, Winter 2009

Dominion of the Fallen series 
This section is arranged in the order the author suggests you read the stories:
 "Court of Birth, Court of Strength," Beneath Ceaseless Skies, Tenth Anniversary Issue, October 2018. 
"Children of Thorns, Children of Water," Uncanny Magazine, July/August 2017. Finalist for 2018 Hugo Award for Best Novelette and 2018 Locus Award for Best Novelette.
"The House, in Winter," in the UK mass market paperback of The House of Shattered Wings, 2016
"Against the Encroaching Darkness," Grimdark Magazine, issue 5, October 2015
"Of Books, and Earth, and Courtship," Nine Dragon Rivers ebook, September 2015
 "In Morningstar's Shadow," August 2015:
 "The Face of Heaven"
 "Paid Debts"
 "What Has To Be Done"
 "The Death of Aiguillon," A Fantasy Medley 3, 2015

Other 
 "The Long Tail," in Wired, The Future of Work, November 30, 2020. 
"The Scholar of the Bamboo Flute," in Silk & Steel: A Queer Speculative Adventure Anthology, ed. Janine A. Southard, Cantina Publishing, November 2020
"The Inaccessibility of Heaven," Uncanny Magazine, July/August 2020. Finalist for Best Novelette for 2021 Hugo Awards, Locus Awards, and Ignyte Awards.
 "In the Lands of the Spill," Avatar anthology, Xprize, March 2020. Finalist for 2021 Locus Award for Best Short Story.  
"Among the Water Buffaloes, a Tiger's Steps," in Mechanical Animals, ed. Selena Chambers and Jason Heller, Hex Publishers, November 2018.
"A Burning Sword For Her Cradle," in Echoes: the Saga Book of Ghost Stories, ed. Ellen Datlow, Fall 2018.
"The Counting of Vermillion Beads," in A Thousand Beginnings and Endings, ed. Ellen Oh and Elsie Chapman, Greenwillow Books, June 2018.
"At the Crossroads of Shadow and Bone," in Children of a Different Sky, ed. Alma Alexander, Kos Books, November 17, 2017.
"In Everlasting Wisdom," in Infinity Wars, ed. Jonathan Strahan, Solaris, September 2017.
"Cicada Song, in a Country Since Long Gone," in The Death of All Things, ed. Zombies Need Brains, September 1, 2017.
"Lullaby for a Lost World," Tor.com, June 8, 2016.
 "Prayers of Forges and Furnaces," Mammoth Book of Steampunk, Running Press, 2012. Reprinted in Lightspeed, issue 52, September 2014.
 "The Moon Over Red Seas," Beneath Ceaseless Skies, October 2014.
 "The Dust Queen," in Reach for Infinity, ed. Jonathan Strahan, Solaris Books, June 2014. Finalist for 2014 Locus Award for Best Short Story.
 "The Angel at the Heart of the Rain," Interzone 246, May/June 2013
 "Heaven Under Earth," Electric Velocipede, issue 24, August 2012. Tiptree Honor List for 2013.
 The Numbers Quartet, co-written with Nancy Fulda, Stephen Gaskell, and Benjamin Rosenbaum, Daily Science Fiction, 2012
 "The Heartless Light of Stars"
 "The Princess of the Perfume River"
 "Worlds like a Hundred Thousand Pearls"
 "Exodus Tides", InterGalactic Medicine Show, issue 22, April 2011
 "Blessing the Earth", Tales of Moreauvia, 2011
 "As the Wheel Turns," GUD Magazine, issue 6, September 2010. Reprinted in Epic, Tachyon, 2012. Reprinted in Lightspeed, November 2012.
 "Age of Miracles, Age of Wonders," Interzone, issue 230, September 2010
 "Father's Last Ride," The Immersion Book of Science Fiction, September 2010
 "Father's Flesh, Mother's Blood," Dark Futures, September 2010
 "Silenced Songs," Music for Another World, August 2010
 "Memories in Bronze, Feathers and Blood," Beneath Ceaseless Skies, issue 45, June 2010.
 "Desaparecidos", Realms of Fantasy, June 2010 issue
 "The Wind-Blown Man," Asimov's, February 2010. Reprinted in International Speculative Fiction Annual Anthology, 2012.
 "Melanie," Realms of Fantasy, February 2010. Reprinted on The World SF Blog, October 2010.
 "By Bargain and by Blood," Hub Magazine, issue 108, January 2010
 "The Church of Accelerated Redemption" (with Gareth L. Powell), Shine: An Anthology of Optimistic SF, Spring 2010
 "Eye of the Destroyer," Blood and Devotion, Spring 2010
 "In the Age of Iron and Ashes," Beneath Ceaseless Skies, issue 33, December 2009.
 "After the Fire", Apex Magazine, November 2009
 "On Horizon's Shores", Intergalactic Medicine Show, issue 14, September 2009. Reprinted in Intergalactic Medicine Show: Big Book of SF Novelettes (Intergalactic Medicine Show Big Books) Volume 1.
 "Golden Lilies," Fantasy Magazine, August 2009
 "Blighted Heart," Beneath Ceaseless Skies, issue 22, July 2009.
 "Healing Hands," Fantastical Visions IV, July 2009
 "Memories of my Sister," Expanded Horizons, issue 7, May 2009
 "Ys", Interzone, issue 222, May 2009. Reprinted in The Alchemy Press Book of Ancient Wonders, 2012.
 "Dancing for the Monsoon", Abyss & Apex, issue 30, April 2009
 "The Lonely Heart," Black Static, issue 9, February 2009. Reprinted in Eight Against Reality, Panverse Publishing, June 2010. Reprinted in Lightspeed, January 2015.
 "City of the Gods," Alternative Coordinates, issue 1, Spring 2009
 "Murder in Laochan," New Ceres Nights, Spring 2009
 "The Dragon's Tears," Electric Velocipede, issues 15/16, Autumn 2008
 "Dragon Feasts", Andromeda Spaceways Inflight Magazine, issue 35, June 2008
 "Horus Ascending", Intergalactic Medicine Show, issue 8, April 2008
 "Within the City of the Swan", Shimmer Magazine, Art Issue, February 2008
 "The Dancer's Gift", Fictitious Force, issue 5, Spring 2008
 "At the Gates of White Marble," Leading Edge Magazine, issue 54, December 2007
 "Autumn's Country", Andromeda Spaceways Inflight Magazine, issue 30, August 2007
 "Sea Child," Coyote Wild Magazine, Autumn 2007
 "Deer Flight", Interzone, issue 211, Summer 2007
 "The Naming at the Pool," Reflection's Edge, May 2007
 "Weepers and Ragers," Abyss & Apex, 2nd Quarter 2007
 "Calling the Unicorn," Andromeda Spaceways Inflight Magazine, issue 27, 2007
 "Through the Obsidian Gates," Shimmer Magazine, Autumn 2006 issue
 "For a Daughter," Haruah, May 2006 issue
 "Kindred Spirits," Deep Magic, May 2006 issue
 "Citadel of Cobras," The Sword Review, May 2006 issue
 "The Triad's Gift," Deep Magic, February 2006 issue
 "A Warrior's Death," Shimmer Magazine, Spring 2006 issue

References

Bibliographies by writer
Bibliographies of American writers
Bibliographies of French writers
Science fiction bibliographies